Max Williams (born 2 April 1998) is a Welsh rugby union player who plays for Dragons regional team as a lock forward.

Williams made his debut for the Dragons regional team in 2017 having previously played for Caerleon RFC and Ebbw Vale RFC.

References

External links 
Dragons profile

Welsh rugby union players
Dragons RFC players
Ebbw Vale RFC players
Caerleon RFC players
Living people
1998 births
Rugby union locks